Chuave may refer to:

Chuave, Papua New Guinea, capital of Chuave District
Chuave District, Papua New Guinea
Chuave Rural LLG, Papua New Guinea
Chuave language